James Schureman (February 12, 1756January 22, 1824) was an American merchant and statesman from New Brunswick, New Jersey.  He represented New Jersey in the Continental Congress as well as the United States House of Representatives and United States Senate.

Biography 
James was born in New Brunswick in the Province of New Jersey and attended Queen's College (now Rutgers University), graduating in 1775. When he graduated he raised a volunteer company in New Brunswick and led it as Captain in the Middlesex County militia.  He led them in the Battle of Brooklyn on August 27, 1776 where he was captured.  He was held as a prisoner of war until early in the spring of 1777 when he escaped to rejoin the Continental Army at Morristown.

Schureman returned to New Brunswick and took up a mercantile career while still serving in the militia.  He was elected to the New Jersey General Assembly from 1783 to 1785.  In 1786, New Jersey sent him as a delegate to the Continental Congress.  That same year he was one of those at the Annapolis Convention that called for a new constitution for the United States. He continued in the Congressional session of 1787, then was returned to the state assembly in 1788.

When the United States was formed, Schureman was elected to the First House of Representatives, serving from 1789 until 1791.  He served two other terms in the House, in the 9th Congress (1797–1799) and 14th Congress (1813–1815).  He was elected to the U.S. Senate to complete the term of John Rutherfurd and served there from 1799 to 1801.  Between these duties he served a number of years as the Mayor of New Brunswick, New Jersey including 1792–1794, 1801–1813, and 1821–1824. He also represented Middlesex County, New Jersey on the New Jersey Legislative Council for the 1808, 1810, and 1812–1813 sessions of the legislature, serving as Vice-President of Council in the latter session.

When Schureman died in 1824 at New Brunswick, he was buried in the churchyard of the First Dutch Reformed Church there.  The church and cemetery still stand and are located at Neilson and Bayard Streets.

References

External links 
 
 Rutgers Hall of Distinguished Alumni 

1756 births
1824 deaths
Continental Congressmen from New Jersey
18th-century American politicians
United States senators from New Jersey
Rutgers University alumni
American people of Dutch descent
Mayors of New Brunswick, New Jersey
Members of the New Jersey Legislative Council
Members of the New Jersey General Assembly
Federalist Party United States senators
People of colonial New Jersey
Burials in New Jersey
Federalist Party members of the United States House of Representatives from New Jersey
Colonial American merchants
People from New Brunswick, New Jersey